Standard Liège is a Belgian professional football team formed in 1898. Throughout its history the club's first team has competed in various national and international competitions. All players who have played in 50 or more such matches are listed below.

Key
Players with name in bold currently play for the club.
Years are the first and last calendar years in which the player appeared in competitive first-team football for the club.
League appearances and goals comprise those in the Belgian First Division A and its predecessors of top-level league football in Belgium.
Total appearances and goals comprise those in the Belgian First Division A, Belgian First Division A Playoffs, Belgian Cup, Belgian League Cup, Belgian Super Cup, UEFA Europa League, UEFA Europa League and several now-defunct competitions.

Players with 10 or more appearances
Appearances and goals are for first-team competitive matches only. Substitute appearances are included. Statistics are correct as of 1 May 2017.

Position key:
GK – Goalkeeper; 
DF – Defender;
MF – Midfielder;
FW – Forward

References
General
Belgian Soccer Database

Specific

     
Royal Standard de Liège
Association football player non-biographical articles
Players